Louis, Dauphin of France (Louis Ferdinand; 4 September 1729 – 20 December 1765) was the elder and only surviving son of King Louis XV of France and his wife, Queen Marie Leszczyńska. As a son of the king, Louis was a fils de France. As heir apparent, he became Dauphin of France. However, he died before he could ascend the throne. Three of his sons became kings of France: Louis XVI (reign in 1774–1792), Louis XVIII (1814–1815, again in 1815–1824) and Charles X (1824–1830).

Early life and education

Louis's birth secured the throne and his mother's position at court, which previously had been precarious due to her giving birth to three daughters in a row before the birth of the Dauphin. He had a younger brother, Philippe, who died as a toddler.

Louis was baptised privately and without a name by Cardinal Armand de Rohan. On 27 April 1737 when he was seven years old the public ceremony of the other baptismal rites took place. It was at this point that he was given the names Louis Ferdinand. His godparents was his cousin Louis, Duke of Orléans, and his great-grandaunt the Dowager Duchess of Bourbon.

Louis' governess was Madame de Ventadour who had previously served as his father's governess. When he was seven years old, the Duke of Châtillon was named his governor, the Count of Muy was named under-governor, and Jean-François Boyer, formerly bishop of Mirepoix, was named preceptor.

From an early age Louis took a great interest in the military arts. He was bitterly disappointed when his father would not permit him to join the 1744 campaign in the War of the Austrian Succession. When his father became deathly ill with fever at Metz, Louis disobeyed orders and went to his bedside. This rash action, which could have resulted in the deaths of both Louis and his father, resulted in a permanent change in the relations between father and son. Until then, Louis XV had doted on his son, but now the relationship was more distant. He was very close to his three older sisters.

First marriage
In 1744 Louis XV negotiated a marriage between his fifteen-year-old son and the eighteen-year-old Infanta Maria Teresa Rafaela of Spain, daughter of King Philip V of Spain and his Italian wife, Elisabeth Farnese, and first cousin of Louis XV. The marriage contract was signed 13 December 1744; the marriage was celebrated by proxy in Madrid on 18 December 1744 and in person at Versailles on 23 February 1745.

Louis and Maria Teresa Rafaela were well-matched and had a real affection for each other. They had one daughter, Princess Marie Thérèse of France (19 July 1746 – 27 April 1748). Three days after the birth of their daughter, Louis's wife, Maria Teresa Rafaela, died on 22 July 1746. Louis was only 16 years old. He grieved intensely at the loss of his wife, but his responsibility to provide for the succession to the French crown required he marry again quickly.

In 1746, Louis received the Order of the Golden Fleece from his father-in-law, King Philip V of Spain.

Second marriage
On 10 January 1747, Louis was married by proxy in Dresden to Maria Josepha of Saxony, the 15-year-old younger daughter of Frederick Augustus II, Prince-Elector of Saxony and King of Poland, and his wife Archduchess Maria Josepha of Austria. A second marriage ceremony took place in person at Versailles on 9 February 1747.

Children

Stillborn son (30 January 1748)
Stillborn son (10 May 1749)
Marie Zéphyrine of France (26 August 1750 – 1 September 1755); died in childhood.
Louis Joseph of France, Duke of Burgundy (13 September 1751 – 22 March 1761); died in childhood.
Stillborn daughter (9 March 1752)
Xavier of France, Duke of Aquitaine (8 September 1753 – 22 February 1754); died in infancy.
Louis XVI of France (23 August 1754 – 21 January 1793); married Archduchess Maria Antonia of Austria, known as Marie Antoinette, and had issue.
Louis XVIII of France (17 November 1755 – 16 September 1824); married Princess Marie Joséphine of Savoy, no issue.
Stillborn son (1756)
 Charles X of France (9 October 1757 – 6 November 1836); married Princess Marie Thérèse of Savoy and had issue.
 Marie Clotilde de France (23 September 1759 – 7 March 1802); married Charles Emmanuel IV of Sardinia, no issue.
Stillborn son (1762)
 Élisabeth of France (3 May 1764 – 10 May 1794); died unmarried and without issue.

Personality
Louis was well-educated: a studious man, cultivated, and a lover of music, he preferred the pleasures of conversation to those of hunting, balls, or spectacles. With a keen sense of morality, he was very much committed to his wife, Marie-Josèphe, as she was to him.

Very devout, he was a fervent supporter of the Jesuits, like his mother and sisters, and was led by them to have a devotion to the Sacred Heart. He appeared in the eyes of his sisters as the ideal of the Christian prince, in sharp contrast with their father, who was a notorious womanizer.

Later life and death

Kept away from government affairs by his father, Louis was at the center of the Dévots, a group of religiously minded men who hoped to gain power when he succeeded to the throne.

Louis died of tuberculosis at Fontainebleau in 1765 at the age of 36, while his father was still alive, so he never became king of France. His mother, Queen Marie Leszczyńska, and his maternal grandfather, the former king of Poland, Stanislaus I Leszczyński, Duke of Lorraine, also survived him. His eldest surviving son, Louis-Auguste, duc de Berry, became the new dauphin, ascending the throne as Louis XVI at the death of Louis XV, in May 1774.

Louis was buried in the Cathedral of Saint-Étienne in Sens at the Monument to the Dauphin of France & Marie-Josephe of Saxony, designed and executed by Guillaume Coustou, the Younger. His heart was buried at Saint Denis Basilica.

Ancestry

References

Further reading

 Broglie, Emmanuel de, Le fils de Louis XV, Louis, dauphin de France, 1729-1765. Paris: E. Plon, 1877.
 Dechêne, Abel, Le dauphin, fils de Louis XV. Paris: Librairie du dauphin, 1931.
 Ducaud-Bourget, François. Louis, dauphin de France: le fils du Bien-Aimé. Paris: Conquistador, 1961.
 Hours, Bernard. La vertu et le secret: le dauphin, fils de Louis XV. Paris: Champion, 2006.
 Huertas, Monique de, Marie-Josèphe de Saxe: mère de nos trois derniers rois de France et de Madame Élisabeth, Paris: Pygmalion, 1995.
 Proyart, Liévin-Bonaventure. Vie du dauphin, père de Louis XVI, Lyon: Bruyset-Ponthus, 1788.
 Rozoir, Charles du, Le dauphin, fils de Louis XV et père de Louis XVI et de Louis XVIII, Paris: Eymery, 1815.
 Zieliński, Ryszard, Polka na francuskim tronie, Warszawa: Czytelnik, 1978.

External links

De la Tour's pastels at the Musée l'Écuyer, Saint-Quentin, (in French) the pastel illustrated above described as a study for one of four portraits de la Tour made of the Dauphin (according to a letter of the Marquis de Marigny), of which the only known survivor, at the Louvre is dated 1748. The curators at the Musée l'Écuyer consider the study above to have served perhaps for the first of these portraits, that of 1745.

|-

1729 births
1765 deaths
18th-century peers of France
18th-century French people
People from Versailles
French people of Polish descent
Knights of the Golden Fleece of Spain
18th-century deaths from tuberculosis
Heirs apparent who never acceded
Tuberculosis deaths in France
Princes of France (Bourbon)
Dauphins of France
Children of Louis XV
Sons of kings